Benjamin Ernest Charlton  (April 12, 1835 - March 12, 1901) was born in Brant County, Upper Canada. He was the mayor of Hamilton, Ontario twice; in 1867 and from 1873 to 1874. In addition to his activities as a politician, Charlton was also a teacher and manufacturer. 

Charlton is buried in Hamilton Cemetery.

Tribute
Charlton Avenue, a street in the lower city of Hamilton, Ontario, was named after him.

References

External links
 

Mayors of Hamilton, Ontario
1835 births
1901 deaths